Nomada priscilla, is a species of bee belonging to the family Apidae subfamily Nomadinae. It is found in Sri Lanka, India and Philippines.

References

External links
 http://animaldiversity.org/accounts/Nomada_priscilla/classification/
 https://www.academia.edu/7390502/AN_UPDATED_CHECKLIST_OF_BEES_OF_SRI_LANKA_WITH_NEW_RECORDS
 https://www.itis.gov/servlet/SingleRpt/SingleRpt?search_topic=TSN&search_value=767499

Nomadinae
Insects described in 1902